Enrique Luis Martin de Bustamente was a Spanish philatelist who was added to the Roll of Distinguished Philatelists in 1989.

Bustamente has won awards for displays at many stamp exhibitions including Brasiliana 93, Capex '96, Pacific '97, and others.

References

Signatories to the Roll of Distinguished Philatelists
Spanish philatelists
Fellows of the Royal Philatelic Society London